New Haven Residential Historic District is a national historic district located at New Haven, Franklin County, Missouri. The district encompasses 26 contributing buildings a predominantly residential section of New Haven. The district developed between about 1857 and 1945, and includes representative examples of Italianate, Queen Anne, Colonial Revival, and Bungalow / American Craftsman style architecture.  Notable buildings include the Langenberg Hat Factory (c. 1890), William H. Otto Furniture Store (c. 1881), Central Hotel (c. 1885), Dr. John S. Leewright House (1857), Lillie Patton House, Richard Schure House, George Wolff Sr. House (1880), Edward Hebbeler House (1916), and Emil Wolff House.

It was listed on the National Register of Historic Places in 1999.

References

Historic districts on the National Register of Historic Places in Missouri
Italianate architecture in Missouri
Queen Anne architecture in Missouri
Colonial Revival architecture in Missouri
Bungalow architecture in Missouri
Buildings and structures in Franklin County, Missouri
National Register of Historic Places in Franklin County, Missouri
1857 establishments in Missouri